Michael Sheehan was an Irish politician and company director. Sheehan was elected to Dáil Éireann as an independent Teachta Dála (TD) for the Cork Borough constituency at the 1948 general election. He lost his seat at the 1951 general election running as a Fine Gael candidate. He also served as Lord Mayor of Cork from 1945 to 1949.

References

 

Year of birth missing
Year of death missing
Independent TDs
Members of the 13th Dáil
Politicians from County Cork